Win the Race is a song by German musical group Modern Talking. It was released in February 2001 as the first single from the tenth album America. "Win the Race", released in Germany and in other European territories on 26 February 2001, was composed by Dieter Bohlen and became the anthem for Formula One in Germany in 2001. The single peaked at No. 5 in Germany on 26 March 2001, exactly one month after its release. While the single was successful enough in Germany to spend total of 13 weeks on the singles-chart, it only managed to peak at No. 14 in Austria, meanwhile entering the top-40 in Switzerland and Sweden.

Track listing 
CD-Maxi Hansa 74321 84311 2 (BMG) / EAN 0743218431128 26.02.2001
 "Win The Race" (Radio Edit) - 3:35
 "Win The Race" (Instrumental Version) - 3:39
 "Win The Race" (Scooter Remix) - 4:43
 "Cinderella Girl" - 3:34
 "Cinderella Girl" (Instrumental Version) - 3:34

Chart position

Weekly charts

Year-end charts

References

External links

Modern Talking songs
2001 singles
Songs written by Dieter Bohlen
Ariola Records singles
2001 songs